Aleksandra Nikolayevna Kulicheva (also Kostina, born 14 May 1987) is a Russian basketball center. Between 2010 and 2013 she played as Kostina and won the 2013 EuroCup with Dynamo Moscow.

References

1987 births
Living people
Russian women's basketball players
Centers (basketball)